Lucienne Pageot-Rousseaux (6 April 1899  – 28 May 1994) was a French painter, specialising in subjects from the ballet and dance. Her work was part of the painting event in the art competition at the 1928 Summer Olympics.

References

1899 births
1994 deaths
20th-century French painters
French women painters
Olympic competitors in art competitions
Painters from Paris